Abdulla bin Mohamed Al Hamed (born 23 February 1973) is the Chairman of the Department of Health in the Emirate of Abu Dhabi and a member of Abu Dhabi Executive Council

Profile
Al Hamed was born in Abu Dhabi-UAE 1973. He was conferred a Bachelor of Science in Business Administration by Mercyhurst College, Mercyhurst, Oregon, U.S.A. in December 1996 and in May 2007 he obtained Masters of Business Administration from New York Institute of Technology, Abu Dhabi branch, U.A.E.

Experience 
He is the Chairman of Department of Health, Member of Abu Dhabi Executive Council which is considered the top of the governmental hierarchy for Abu Dhabi, Member of Executive Committee of the Government of Abu Dhabi, Board member of Abu Dhabi Developmental Holding Company PJSC "ADQ", Board member of Zayed Higher Organization for People of Determination, Member of Abu Dhabi Life Quality Committee, Board member of Trustees of Abu Dhabi Early Childhood Authority & Board member of Frontlines Heroes Office, Member of Emirati Genome program, Chairman of Q Holding PJSC, Member of the Executive Committee of Al Jazira Club’s & Chairman of the board of directors of Al Jazira Investment Company, Member of the Board of Trustees of Abu Dhabi University

HE held several positions including :

Chairman of Energy Authority During 2016-2017, Chairman of Regulation and Supervision Bureua During 2016-2017, Member of Abu Dhabi Supreme Petroleum Council (SPC) During 2016-2017, Chairman of Abu Dhabi Water & Electricity Authority During 2015-2016, Under Secretary of Ministry of Foreign Affairs During 2012 to 2014, Managing Director of the European Affairs Department at the Ministry of Foreign Affairs During 2011 to 2012, Chairman of the Western Region Development Council During 2004 to 2011, Under Secretary of the Ruler’s Representative Court House of the Western Region During 2001 to 2010 & an Employee of Abu Dhabi Investment Authority During 1997-2000.

Awards & Certificates of Appreciation 
His Excellency won Pioneer Leadership award in Healthcare "Arab Hospitals Federation Award – Medhealth Cairo 2022", His Excellency won two awards from Department Health - Abu Dhabi in the "2021 Middle East & North Africa Stevie® Awards" namely the Gold Award for "Innovative Management – Organizations with 100 or More Employees" and for "Government Hero of the year" in COVID–19 response category, His Excellency also obtained award as 2021 CEO Awards as part of the "Globe Business Awards" the Gold award for "Executive Hero of the Year, 2021" for his efforts in the health sector in response to the COVID-19 pandemic in the emirate, .Certificate of Appreciation from Al Madam Municipality, Emirate of Sharjah for maintaining the best desert camp, Certificate of Appreciation from the Department of Planning & Economy, Abu Dhabi for support and active participation in the 2005 Census and Certificate of Appreciation from the Red Crescent Society, U.A.E. for his ongoing support for the organization & its branches worldwide (Ethiopia, Tanzania and Vietnam).

Accomplishments 
As a committee member he assisted in establishing the organization chart for the Western Region government sector, by creating government offices and services. He also established the Abu Dhabi Motor Club which is the main sponsor and organizer of major off road motor sporting events in the emirate of Abu Dhabi. Last but not least, H.E. established a safari hunting company in the United Republic of Tanzania, in 2010 .

References

People from the Emirate of Abu Dhabi
1973 births
Living people